The 1926 Fresno State Bulldogs football team represented Fresno State Normal School—now known as California State University, Fresno—during the 1926 college football season.

Fresno State competed in the Far Western Conference (FWC). The 1926 team was led by head coach Arthur W. Jones in his sixth year at the helm. They played home games at Fresno State College Stadium on the campus of Fresno City College in Fresno, California. They finished with a record of five wins, three losses and one tie (5–3–1, 1–2–1 FWC). The Bulldogs outscored their opponents 147–107 for the season.

Schedule

Notes

References

Fresno State
Fresno State Bulldogs football seasons
Fresno State Bulldogs football